John Seymour Lucas  (21 December 1849 – 8 May 1923) was a Victorian English historical and portrait painter, as well as an accomplished theatrical costume designer. He was born into an artistic London family (he was the nephew of the painter John Lucas), and originally trained as a woodcarver, but turned his attention to portrait painting and entered first the St. Martin's Lane Art School and later the Royal Academy Schools. Here he met fellow artist Marie Cornelissen from France, whom he married in 1877. Lucas' artistic education included extensive travels around Europe, particularly Holland and Spain, where he studied the Flemish and Spanish masters. He first started exhibiting in 1872, was elected an associate member of the Royal Academy in 1886, and a full Royal Academician in 1899.

Biography and work 

John Seymour Lucas was first and foremost a historical genre painter with a particular talent for realism in the depiction of costumes and interiors. Inspired by van Dyck and particularly Diego Velázquez, he excelled in depicting scenes from the British 16th- to 18th-century Tudor and Stuart periods, including in particular the Spanish Armada, the English Civil War, and the Jacobite rebellions.

His first major work to achieve widespread public acclaim was Rebel Hunting after Culloden, executed in 1884. It was praised not only for the obvious tension between the muscular blacksmiths and the red-coated forces of law and order (or repression), but for the extraordinary realism in the depiction of the rough smithy and glowing horseshoe on the anvil.

As his reputation grew, Lucas increasingly mixed in society circles. He became firm friends with the famous society portrait painter John Singer Sargent who was his almost exact contemporary. A portrait of Lucas executed by John Singer Sargent is displayed in Tate Britain. Towards the 1890s John Seymour Lucas executed a number of major works for prestigious public buildings or royal clients. These include: The Flight of the Five Members (Houses of Parliament), The Granting of the Charter of the City of London (Royal Exchange), Reception by HM King Edward VII of the Moorish Ambassador (Royal Collection), HRH the Prince of Wales in German Uniform (Royal Collection).

In addition to executing more than 100 major oil paintings and a host of drawings, Lucas was renowned as a set and costume designer for the historical dramas popular on the late Victorian and early Edwardian stages. One of his more unusual commissions was the "Duke of Normandy" costume for the ill-fated prince Alfred of Saxe Coburg-Gotha for the Devonshire House Ball in 1897. Lucas was also a prolific watercolour painter; he was elected as a member of the Institute of Painters in Water Colours in 1877.

During most of his artistic career, Lucas lived in a purpose-built studio in South Hampstead, London, designed for him by his friend and fellow artist, architect Sydney Williams-Lee.

Lucas joined the Sylvan Debating Club in 1872, and painted a portrait of the society's founder Alfred Harmsworth.

He retired from painting towards the end of World War I and moved to Blythburgh, Suffolk, where he re-designed a house next to the church known as "The Priory". Lucas died in 1923 and is interred in the churchyard of Holy Trinity church in Blythburgh. His son, Sydney Seymour Lucas, also became an artist and illustrator.

Legacy 
John Seymour Lucas was a renowned artist in his day, when his painting style and themes resonated with the core themes of Imperial Great Britain: the uniqueness of the British historical experience and the nation's seemingly inexorable rise to global preeminence. His love for colourful detail, veracity and the theatrical was well suited to the tastes of the late Victorian audience. However, the end of Pax Britannica and the rise of Modernism left these twin pillars of the Lucas oeuvre slightly marooned and he is less than a household name in the 21st century. But he left a unique legacy as a chronicler of British history and a costume painter of distinction.

References 

This article is based on articles in the Art Journal of March 1887 and December 1908, Current Art Notes 1923, as well as the 1911 Encyclopædia Britannica biographical entry.

External links 

 
National Portrait Gallery
Royal Collection
Profile on Royal Academy of Arts Collections
 
 Sydney Seymour Lucas (son) at WorldCat

19th-century English painters
English male painters
20th-century English painters
1849 births
1923 deaths
Painters from London
People from Blythburgh
Artists' Rifles soldiers
19th-century painters of historical subjects
Royal Academicians
Members of the Royal Institute of Painters in Water Colours
20th-century English male artists
19th-century English male artists